Dean James Callaway (born 10 December 1970) is an Australian former professional rugby league footballer who played in the 1990s and 2000s. He played for Illawarra in Australia and London Broncos in the Super League.

Playing career
Callaway made his first grade debut for Illawarra in Round 10 1991 against Manly-Warringah at WIN Stadium.  In 1997, Callaway made 15 appearances as Illawarra reached the finals by finishing 6th.  Callaway played in their elimination final defeat against the Gold Coast.

In 1998, Callaway made 19 appearances in what would prove to be Illawarra's final season in the top grade.  Callaway captained the side in their final ever game which was in Round 24 1998 which ended in a 25-24 loss against Canterbury-Bankstown at WIN Stadium.

In 1999, Callaway joined English side the London Broncos after not being offered a contract to play with the joint venture side.  Callaway made a total of 58 appearances for London and scored 13 tries before retiring.

Post playing
In 2008, Callaway coached the Dapto Canaries who play in the Illawarra Rugby League competition.

References

External links
NRL points
Rugby League Project stats
SL stats
Dean
Broncos make Rhinos suffer
Leikvoll, Wessel to give Dapto punch

1970 births
Living people
Australian rugby league players
Australian expatriate sportspeople in England
London Broncos players
Illawarra Steelers players
Rugby league hookers
Place of birth missing (living people)